Bhimber Dam is a proposed dam to be built over Bhimber Nullah located in Bhimber District, Azad Kashmir, Pakistan.

References

Dams in Pakistan